The 2018 Swope Park Rangers season is the club's third year of play and their third season in the Western Conference of the United Soccer League, the second tier of the United States Soccer Pyramid. The Rangers moved from the Swope Soccer village to Shawnee Mission District Stadium in Overland Park, Kansas for the team's season opener, before playing the rest of the 2018 schedule at Children's Mercy Park.

Previous season 
The 2017 Swope Park Rangers season finished the year with a record of 17-7-8 and 4th in the Western Conference qualifying for the 2017 USL Playoffs.

In the first round, the Rangers defeated #5 seed Phoenix Rising on penalty kicks 4-2 after a draw in regulation (1-1). In the conference semi-finals, the Rangers would keep rolling with another win facing the #8 seed Sacramento Republic FC 1-0. The Rangers opponent in the conference Finals was the OKC Energy FC; they tied at the end of regulation and would win in penalty kicks 7-6. For the second year in a row, Swope Park Rangers made it to the USL Championship game; and for the second year in a row would lose the Cup, but to Louisville City FC 1-0.

Current roster

Competitions

Preseason

USL Regular season

Standings

Matches

Postseason

Player statistics

Top scorers

Source:

References

Swope
Swope
Sporting Kansas City II seasons
Swope Park